Brion Rush (born November 15, 1984) is an American professional basketball player for the Crailsheim Merlins of the Basketball Bundesliga (BBL). He played college basketball for Grambling State University.

College career
Brion Rush played college basketball for Grambling State from Southwestern Athletic Conference. He averaged 19.5 ppg, 5.2 rpg, 2.8 apg and 1.7 spg during his college career. Rush was named SWAC Freshman of the Year in 2003, three times All-SWAC first team (in 2004-2006) and Player of the Year in 2006.

Professional career
Rush went undrafted in the 2006 NBA draft. In August 2006, he signed a one-year deal with Aurora Basket Jesi of the Legadue Basket.

In June 2007, Rush signed a one-year deal with the French Euroleague team Chorale Roanne Basket. For the 2008–09 season he signed with Strasbourg IG. He was the second best scorer of the season, averaging 21.20 points per game.

In September 2009, he signed a one-year deal with Triumph Lyubertsy of Russia. In July 2010, he signed a two-year deal with another Russian club BC Krasnye Krylia.

In October 2012, he signed a short-term deal with Élan Chalon of France. After the contract expired, he left Chalon. In December 2012, he signed with BC Astana of Kazakhstan. In April 2014, he re-signed with Astana for one more season.

In February 2015, Rush signed with ratiopharm Ulm of Germany for the rest of the season.

On December 29, 2015, he signed with the Montenegrin club Sutjeska. On February 17, 2016, he parted ways with Sutjeska. The next day, he signed with Azad University Tehran of the Iranian Basketball Super League.

In October 2016, Rush agreed a one-month with Spanish club ICL Manresa. On December 18, 2016, he signed with French club SLUC Nancy Basket for the rest of the season.

On August 1, 2017, Rush signed with German club BG Göttingen.

References

External links 
 Euroleague.net profile
 Eurobasket.com profile
 FIBA.com profile
 Brion Rush college stats

1984 births
Living people
African-American basketball players
American expatriate basketball people in France
American expatriate basketball people in Germany
American expatriate basketball people in Iran
American expatriate basketball people in Italy
American expatriate basketball people in Kazakhstan
American expatriate basketball people in Montenegro
American expatriate basketball people in Russia
American expatriate basketball people in Spain
Basketball players from Shreveport, Louisiana
Bàsquet Manresa players
BC Astana players
BC Krasnye Krylia players
BC Zenit Saint Petersburg players
BG Göttingen players
Chorale Roanne Basket players
Crailsheim Merlins players
Élan Chalon players
Grambling State Tigers men's basketball players
KK Sutjeska players
Liga ACB players
Ratiopharm Ulm players
Shooting guards
SIG Basket players
SLUC Nancy Basket players
American men's basketball players
21st-century African-American sportspeople
20th-century African-American people